The 2021 Racing Louisville FC season was the club's first season of play. Racing Louisville competed in the National Women's Soccer League, the top flight of professional women's soccer in the United States.

Background 

Racing Louisville FC was announced on October 22, 2019, as an NWSL expansion team set to begin play in the 2021 season. Former Sky Blue FC head coach Christy Holly was named as Racing Louisville FC's first head coach on August 12, 2020. The club proceeded to build their roster through a combination of free agent signings, a trade with Chicago Red Stars for Savannah McCaskill and Yūki Nagasato in exchange draft protection, the 2020 NWSL Expansion Draft, and the 2021 NWSL Draft. Since the opening of the season, Racing also added English internationals Gemma Bonner and Ebony Salmon, former North Carolina Courage defender Sinclaire Miramontez, and Dutch international Nadia Nadim.

Holly was fired for cause on August 31, 2021, and the club named Mario Sanchez, head of the club's youth academy and former collegiate coach, as the interim head coach.

Current squad

Competitions

Preseason friendlies

NWSL Challenge Cup

Standings — East Division

Match results
Racing Louisville's group stage matches in the East Division of the 2021 NWSL Challenge Cup were the first competitive matches in club history. The opening match, a 2–2 draw against Orlando Pride, was the club's first at their home ground, Lynn Family Stadium. With two draws and two losses in four group matches, Racing finished at the bottom of East Division in their first Challenge Cup.

NWSL Regular Season

Standings

Results summary

Match results

The Women's Cup

Racing Louisville hosted and participated in the inaugural The Women's Cup, a four-team competition featuring two sides from the NWSL and two sides from Europe. Racing Louisville and Chicago Red Stars from NWSL were joined by Paris Saint-Germain Féminine and FC Bayern Munich.  In the semifinals on August 18, 2021, Racing Louisville drew with Chicago Red Stars and advanced to the Championship match on penalty kicks, where they would face Bayern Munich, who had also advanced past Paris Saint-Germain via penalty shootout. In the Championship match, Racing Louisville fell behind early in the second half before quickly equalizing on a goal by Jorian Baucom, then took the lead on a goal by Yūki Nagasato, only to yield another to Bayern Munich in stoppage time, sending the match to penalties. Racing Louisville prevailed in an 11-round shootout, after backup goalkeeper Katie Lund converted her spot kick and saved the attempt by her counterpart, Laura Benkarth.

NWSL Playoffs

Racing Louisville did not qualify for the NWSL Playoffs. Playoffs will start on November 6 and will conclude with the NWSL Championship on November 20, to be held at Lynn Family Stadium in Louisville.

Player statistics

Top scorers

Assist leaders

Clean sheets

Disciplinary

References

External links 
 Racing Louisville FC

Racing Louisville FC
Racing Louisville FC seasons
2021 in sports in Kentucky